Červený Újezd is a municipality and village in Benešov District in the Central Bohemian Region of the Czech Republic. It has about 300 inhabitants.

Administrative parts
Villages of Horní Borek, Milhostice, Nové Dvory, Styrov and Třetužel are administrative parts of Červený Újezd.

References

Villages in Benešov District